Alan Furst (born 1941) is an American author of historical spy novels. Furst has been called "an heir to the tradition of Eric Ambler and Graham Greene," whom he cites along with Joseph Roth and Arthur Koestler as important influences. Most of his novels since 1988 have been set just prior to or during the Second World War and he is noted for his successful evocations of Eastern European peoples and places during the period from 1933 to 1944.

Biography
Furst was born in New York City, and raised on the Upper West Side of Manhattan. His family has ancestors in Poland, Latvia, and Russia. His great-grandfather was drafted into the Russian army, and, as a Jew, was required to  serve 20 years.

He attended the Horace Mann School, received a B.A. from Oberlin College in 1962, and an M.A. from Penn State in 1967.

While attending general studies courses at Columbia University, he became acquainted with Margaret Mead, for whom he later worked. Before becoming a full-time novelist, Furst worked in advertising and wrote magazine articles, most notably for Esquire, and as a columnist for the International Herald Tribune.

Early writings
Furst's papers were obtained by the Harry Ransom Humanities Research Center at The University of Texas at Austin. They include a 1963 letter from his grandfather, Max Stockman, which urged Furst to become a teacher and 'write as a sideline' in his spare time. The collection also includes early articles on a wide variety of topics, published in many magazines for which no common denominator can be found, including Architectural Digest, Elle, Esquire, 50 Plus, International Herald Tribune, Islands, New Choices, New York, The New York Times, Pursuits, Salon, and Seattle Weekly.

The Ransom collection remarks: "Of note is the April 1984 Esquire article, 'The Danube Blues,' which sparked Furst's interest in writing espionage novels. Numerous slides of his 1983 Danube trip are also available. Unproduced screenplays include 'Heroes of the Last War' (1984), and 'Warsaw' (1992)."

His early novels (1976–1983) achieved limited success. One item, held in the Ransom collection, includes the manuscript for "One Smart Cookie" (with Debbi Fields, 1987), a commissioned biography of the owner of the Mrs. Fields Cookies company.

The year 1988 saw publication of Night Soldiers—inspired by his 1984 trip to Eastern Europe on assignment for Esquire—which invigorated his career and led to a succession of related titles. His output since 1988 includes a dozen works. He is especially noted for his successful evocations of Eastern European peoples and places during the period from 1933 to 1944. While all his historical espionage novels are loosely connected (protagonists in one book might appear as minor characters in another), only The World at Night and Red Gold share a common plot.

Writing in The New York Times, the novelist Justin Cartwright says that Furst, who lives in Sag Harbor, Long Island, "has adopted a European sensibility." Awarded a Fulbright teaching fellowship in 1969, Furst moved to Sommières, France, outside of Montpellier, and taught at the University of Montpellier. He later lived for many years in Paris, a city that he calls "the heart of civilisation" which figures significantly in all his novels.

In 2011, the Tulsa Library Trust in Tulsa, Oklahoma selected Furst to receive its Helmerich Award, a literary prize given annually to honor a distinguished author's body of work.

In 2012, he appeared in a documentary about the life and work of author W. Somerset Maugham, Revealing Mr. Maugham.

Works

Stand-alone novel 
Shadow Trade (1983)

Roger Levin
Your Day in the Barrel (1976)
The Paris Drop (1980)
The Caribbean Account (1981)

Night Soldiers novels 
Night Soldiers (1988)
Dark Star (1991)
The Polish Officer (1995)
The World at Night (1996)
Red Gold (1999)
Kingdom of Shadows (2000)
Blood of Victory (2003)
Dark Voyage (2004)
The Foreign Correspondent (2006)
The Spies of Warsaw (2008)
Spies of the Balkans (2010)
Mission to Paris (2012)
Midnight in Europe (2014)
A Hero of France (2016)
Under Occupation (2019)

Crossovers
Secondary characters who appear in more than one Furst novel include:
 Ilya Goldman, NKVD (Night Soldiers, Dark Star, Kingdom of Shadows, The Foreign Correspondent)
 Ivan Ivanovich Agayants, NKVD (Night Soldiers, Dark Star)
 Colonel Vassily Antipin (Night Soldiers, Red Gold)
 General Bloch, GRU (Night Soldiers, Dark Star)
 Renate Braun, Comintern foreign specialist (Night Soldiers, Dark Star)
 Maltsaev, NKVD (Night Soldiers, Dark Star)
 Voyschinkowsky, The Lion of the Bourse (Night Soldiers, Dark Star, The Polish Officer, Kingdom of Shadows, The Foreign Correspondent)
 Colonel Anton Vyborg, Polish military intelligence (The Polish Officer, Dark Star, The Spies of Warsaw)
 Count Janos Polanyi (Kingdom of Shadows, Blood of Victory, Dark Star, The Foreign Correspondent, Mission To Paris, Midnight in Europe)
 S. Kolb, British agent (Dark Voyage, The Foreign Correspondent, Spies of the Balkans, briefly in Midnight in Europe, A Hero of France)
 Max de Lyon, spy and owner of Le Cygne night club (Midnight in Europe, A Hero of France)
 Stavros, spy and friend of Max de Lyon (Midnight in Europe, A Hero of France)
 Dr. Lapp, Abwehr (Kingdom of Shadows, The Spies of Warsaw; mentioned in Blood of Victory)
 Boris Balki, Russian emigre bartender in Paris (Kingdom of Shadows, Blood of Victory)
 Mark Shublin, Polish painter (Kingdom of Shadows, The Spies of Warsaw)
 Louis Fischfang, screenwriter (The Foreign Correspondent, The World at Night; is mentioned a few times, but does not appear, in Red Gold) 
 Lady Marensohn, American/British agent (Night Soldiers, The World at Night)
 Jean Casson, a film producer and protagonist of The World At Night and Red Gold, is mentioned, but does not appear, in Mission To Paris)
 Ivanic, NKVD assassin (The World At Night, Red Gold)
 Cara Dionello, Nicholas Morath's Argentine girlfriend (Kingdom Of Shadows, The Foreign Correspondent)
 British intelligence operatives in Europe (mainly Paris), such as
 Lady Angela Hope (appears in Night Soldiers and Dark Star; mentioned in Red Gold, The Foreign Correspondent, Kingdom of Shadows, Blood of Victory)
 Roddy Fitzware (Night Soldiers, Dark Star)
 Mr. Brown (Night Soldiers, Blood of Victory, Dark Voyage, The Foreign Correspondent)
 Momo Tsipler & his Wienerwald Companions, a night-club act  (Dark Star, Blood of Victory and The Foreign Correspondent)
 Brasserie Heininger, Paris restaurant (every book; inspired by the real-life Bistro Bofinger)

References

External links
 Alan Furst.net
 Our Best Thriller Writer
 Inventory of Alan Furst Papers 1961-2005 at the Harry Ransom Humanities Research Center at the University of Texas at Austin.
 Writers Reflect with Alan Furst at the Harry Ransom Center

1941 births
20th-century American male writers
20th-century American novelists
21st-century American Jews
21st-century American male writers
21st-century American novelists
American historical novelists
American male novelists
American spy fiction writers
Horace Mann School alumni
Jewish American novelists
Living people
Novelists from New York (state)
Oberlin College alumni
Pennsylvania State University alumni
People from Sag Harbor, New York
People from the Upper West Side